Disco Not Disco is a compilation album from  the Disco Not Disco series released by Strut Records in 2000. The album is a probe for both the experimental side of disco and punk genres, as well as  underground music scene in general. The first volume is more rock and funk oriented and features three experimental studio projects by Arthur Russell, namely Dinosaur, Indian Ocean and Loose Joints, British new wave musician Ian Dury, and even musicians like Yoko Ono, Steve Miller Band or jazz trumpeter Don Cherry.

It was compiled by Joey Negro, a British DJ and producer.

Some songs included on this album did well on the Billboard Club chart.

The song "Cavern" by Liquid Liquid was also used in Grandmaster Flash song called "White Lines (Don't Do It)".

Reception
Allmusic (4.5/5) – states that "not only does the music stand on its own (there's a reason why thousands of young DJs and vinyl hounds collapsed in confoundment upon finding out that these rare gems were being issued together), but the liner notes provide a story behind each song, only adding to the mystique."

Track listing

Personnel

 
"Walking on Thin Ice" (1981 Re-edit) 
Engineers: Lee DeCarlo, Sam Ginsberg
Drums: Andy Newmark
Bass guitar: Tony Levin
Rhythm guitar: Earl Slick, Hugh McCracken
Editing: Joseph Watt 
Producers: Jack Douglas, John Lennon, Yoko Ono

"Cavern" 
Drums, percussion: Scott Hartley
Vocals, percussion: Salvatore Principato
Percussion, bass guitar: Richard McGuire
Percussion: Dennis Young

"Tell You (Today)" (Vocal) 
Mixing: Eddie Garcia, Larry Levan, Robert Morety
Producers: Killer Whale, Steve D'Acquisto

"Spasticus Autisticus" (Version) 
Mixing: Steven Stanley
Bass: Robbie Shakespeare
Prophet synthesizer: Tyrone Downie
Electric guitar: Chas Jankel
Vocals: Ian Dury
Drums: Sly Dunbar  

 
"Over and Over" (Long Version) 
Producer: Fred Maher

"Wheel Me Out" 
Producers: David Was, Don Was, Jack Tann
   
"Kiss Me Again" (Original Edit) 
Remix: Dinosaur L
Producer: Arthur Russell, Nicky Siano
  
"I Walk" 
Producer: Ramuntcho Matta
Engineer: Michel Reynaud

"Voices Inside My Head" 
Producer: Began Cekic

"Tree House / School Bell" (Part 1) 
Producer: Arthur Russell, Peter Zummo

"Macho City" 
Drums, percussion: Gary Mallaber
Vocals, guitar: Steve Miller
Bass guitar: Gerald Johnson
Keyboards: Byron Allred

References

Experimental rock compilation albums
Post-disco compilation albums
2000 compilation albums